This article contains lists of official and potential third party and independent candidates associated with the 2016 United States presidential election.

"Third party" is a term commonly used in the United States in reference to political parties other than the two major parties, the Democratic Party and the Republican Party. An independent candidate is one who runs for office with no formal party affiliation.

Ballot access in states holding 270 or more electoral votes represents a majority of the 538 electoral votes in the Electoral College. The number of electoral votes for which a party or independent candidate has secured ballot access may increase as those parties or candidates complete their petitions, and filings for ballot access, until September 2016 when the last petition deadlines occur.

According to the Green Papers website, 31 people were on the ballot in at least one state, while 192, including those who were on ballots in some states, obtained recognition as official write-in candidates.

Summary

Candidates

Gary Johnson, Libertarian Party 

Ballot access: The Libertarian ticket was on all 51 ballots.

Nationally, Johnson captured 5 percent or more of the vote in eight states: New Mexico, North Dakota, Alaska, Oklahoma, South Dakota, Montana, Wyoming and Maine.

Poll standings 
All major polling outfits included Johnson in their published results. His highest total was 13% in a CNN/ORC poll taken in July. After that he has generally was in the upper single digits, breaking 10% on October 10 in a Politico/Morning Consult poll.

Johnson's greatest statewide percentage was in his home state of New Mexico, where he reached the mid-twenties in September before  falling back into the teens. He polled in the teens in several other state states, most recently in a WBUR/MassINC poll taken in New Hampshire on November 1.

Party nomination contest 

There were six primaries, Gary Johnson received 22,642 votes while none of the others received as much as 4,000.

Jill Stein, Green Party 

Ballot access (write-in included): 47 states + DC

Poll standings 
All major polling outfits included Stein in their published results. Her highest total was 6% in  McClatchy/Marist poll taken early August. After that her highest total was 4% in a CBS/New York Times poll taken in late October. She generally polled at 2 or 3%.

In statewide polling she reached as high as 7% in an Emerson College poll from Vermont in September.

Party nomination contest 

Five additional candidates sought the Green Party nomination.

Evan McMullin, Better for America Group and others 

The anti-Donald Trump Better for America PAC recruited Evan McMullin as a candidate for president. He was on the ballot in 11 states and had write-in access in several others.

Darrell Castle, Constitution Party 

Electoral votes: 207 (Scott Copeland had access to 4 electoral votes in Idaho, where Castle is on the ballot as an independent)

Write-in included: 406

Ballot access:  Alaska, Arkansas, Colorado, Florida, Hawaii, Idaho, Iowa, Louisiana, Michigan, Minnesota,  Mississippi, Missouri, Nevada, New Jersey, New Mexico, North Dakota, Pennsylvania, South Carolina, South Dakota, Utah, Washington, West Virginia, Wisconsin, Wyoming.
Write-in access: Alabama, Arizona, Delaware, Georgia, Illinois, Indiana, Kansas, Kentucky, Maine, Maryland, Montana, New Hampshire, Ohio, Oregon, Rhode Island, Tennessee, Texas, Vermont, Virginia.

Poll standings 
Castle was not featured in any national polls. He was listed in a few in Utah in August and September, where he got as much as 2%, and in Nevada, where he got 1%.

Nomination contest 
The 2016 presidential nominating convention was held in Salt Lake City, on April 13–16.

Gloria La Riva, multiple parties 
Electoral votes: 80 (Gloria LaRiva has a combined 135 electoral votes via the Party for Socialism and Liberation, the Peace and Freedom Party, and the Liberty Union Party)

Ballot access: California, Colorado, Florida, Louisiana, New Jersey, New Mexico, Vermont, Washington

Party for Socialism and Liberation 

La Riva was on the ballot in numerous states under this banner and as an independent.

Liberty Union Party (Vermont) 

La Riva won the primary in Vermont and thus was awarded the ballot line there.

La Riva participated in the Free and Equal presidential debate.

Peace and Freedom Party 

La Riva won the primary in California and thus was awarded the ballot line at the state convention. Jill Stein, who was on the Green party primary ballot was removed from the PF one.

Rocky De La Fuente, American Delta and Reform Parties, plus others 

Electoral votes: 147 (De La Fuente has access to a combined 147 electoral votes as an Independent, via The American Delta Party and via The Reform Party)

Write-in included: 346 electors

Anticipated write-in included: 404 electors

Ballot access:

Under the ballot label  "Reform Party"   Florida

Under the ballot label  "American Delta Party": Colorado,  Iowa, Louisiana, Minnesota, Mississippi, New Jersey, New Mexico.

As an independent: Alaska, Idaho, Kentucky, Montana, Nevada, New Hampshire, North Dakota,  Rhode Island Tennessee, Utah,  Vermont, Wisconsin,  Wyoming.

Write-in: Alabama, Arizona, California, Delaware, District of Columbia, Indiana, Maryland, Nebraska, New York, Pennsylvania, Oregon, Virginia, Kansas, West Virginia, Washington. Total 199 electors

Anticipated write-in: Connecticut, Missouri, South Dakota

No ballot access 2016: Georgia, Illinois, Maine, Massachusetts, Michigan, North Carolina, South Carolina.

Poll standings 
In August and September, De La Fuente polled 1% in Nevada in a poll conducted by Suffolk University.

American Delta party nomination 
The American Delta Party is an organization specifically created to support De La Fuente's independent candidacy.

Reform party nomination 
The Reform Party recognized the following other candidates as seeking its presidential nomination The vote totals nominating De La Fuente were never released.

Richard Duncan, Independent

Bernie Sanders 

Several grassroots campaigns to elect Bernie Sanders President as a write-in candidate were established on social media in the run-up to the United States presidential election. Though Sanders continued to campaign for Democratic nominee Hillary Clinton, supporters pointed to alleged DNC bias in the Democratic Party's presidential primaries against Sanders, and Clinton's email scandal, and continued to support him. Both Clinton and Donald Trump would have had to win less than the required 270 electoral college votes for Sanders to have denied either candidate the presidency, and for the election to be passed to the House of Representatives - thus the initial write-in campaign around Vermont, offering only 3 electoral college votes, was unsuccessful. The campaign expanded to include all 12 eligible states (one of which listed Sanders as an official write-in candidate), and relied on states such as California, with a high electoral college vote count and large support for Sanders, to be successful in denying both Trump and Clinton. He has received over 100 thousand popular votes and one electoral vote. Two other electoral votes were disallowed.

Notably, he came in third in Vermont, coming ahead of both Gary Johnson and Jill Stein and taking 5.7%  of the vote (18,183 tallied), something that has never happened before in a fall Presidential election.

Dan Vacek, Legal Marijuana Now Party 

Ballot access: Iowa, Minnesota

Alyson Kennedy, Socialist Workers Party 

Electoral votes: 70

Ballot access: Colorado, Louisiana, Minnesota, New Jersey, Tennessee, Utah, Washington

Chris Keniston, Veterans Party of America 
Electoral votes: 15

Ballot access: Colorado, Mississippi

Mike Maturen, American Solidarity Party 

Electoral votes: 9; (as write-in) 332

Ballot access: Colorado; (as write-in) Alabama,
Alaska,
California,
Georgia,
Idaho,
Iowa,
Kansas,
Kentucky,
Maryland,
Michigan,
Minnesota,
Nebraska,
New Hampshire,
New Jersey,
New York,
North Dakota,
Ohio,
Oregon,
Pennsylvania,
Rhode Island,
Texas,
Vermont,
Virginia,
Washington,
Wisconsin

James Hedges, Prohibition Party 

Electoral votes: 21

Ballot access: Arkansas, Colorado, Mississippi

Tom Hoefling, America's Party 
Electoral votes: 44

Ballot access: Arkansas, Colorado, Florida

Monica Moorehead, Workers World Party 

Electoral votes: 30

Ballot access: New Jersey, Utah, Wisconsin(Texas)

Peter Skewes, American Party (South Carolina) 
Electoral votes: 9

Ballot access: South Carolina

Laurence Kotlikoff, Independent

Rocky Giordani, Independent American Party 
Electoral votes: 18

Ballot access: New Mexico, Oregon, Utah

Emidio "Mimi" Soltysik, Socialist Party USA 

Electoral votes: 25

Ballot access: Colorado, Michigan

Rod Silva, Nutrition Party 
Electoral votes: 9

Ballot access: Colorado

Jerry White, Socialist Equality Party 

Electoral votes: 8

Ballot access: Louisiana

Other candidate considerations

American Independent and other fusion tickets 
Several states, most notably New York, permit fusion tickets. A fusion ticket is when a candidate or candidates are permitted more than one ballot line by being nominated by one or more third parties and permitting the votes on all lines to be added together for a single state total.

The Clinton/Kaine ticket was on the ballot in New York on the Women's Equality and Working Families Party lines, while the Trump/Pence ticket was on the Conservative party there as well as the American Independent Party in California.

Conservative party nomination in New York 
The state committee nominated Donald Trump by voice vote.

Total popular vote: 271,961 (3.8%)

Working Families party nomination in New York 
Initially, the Working Families Party had endorsed Bernie Sanders for president, but when he conceded defeat at the Democratic convention and endorsed Hillary Clinton, the party had a mail in primary where Clinton defeated Jill Stein and "no endorsement" with 68% of the vote, preferring fusion rather than "asking voters to cast a vote that is at best meaningless and at worst destructive of progressive possibility."

Total popular vote: 130,245 (1.8%)

Woman's Equality party nomination in New York 
A faction of the party's executive committee nominated Dr. Lynn Sandra Kahn, while another nominated Hillary Clinton. The New York State board of elections decided the former Secretary of State would get the ballot line.

Total popular vote: 32,307 (0.5%)

American Independent Party nomination in California 

The state committee ignored the primary and designated Trump as its nominee.

California did not record a separate ballot total for the AIP.

Party nomination contest
Below are the results of the California Primary ballot, which was rendered superfluous when the state committee decided to select Donald Trump.

No ballot access 
According to the Federal Election Commission almost 2,000 people, both real and fictional, were registered as 2016 presidential candidates.

Among the more notable ones are:

Write-in candidates 
A minimum of 1,022,439 (0.8%) voters cast write-in ballots, what is believed to be a record. Many were for registered candidates who were on the ballot in one or more states, others for candidates who were registered but were on no ballots and others were for fictional or perceptibly humorous figures, like of Mickey Mouse or Buffy the Vampire Slayer. The vast majority of these will never be counted or recorded as individuals but as "Others" or "Scattered." Many states disallow write-in candidacies.

Previously speculated 
The following individuals were the focus of presidential speculation as an independent candidate in multiple media reports during the 2016 election cycle.
 Lawrence Lessig, Professor of Law at Harvard Law School (previously sought Democratic Party presidential nomination)

Withdrew 
 Waka Flocka Flame, rap artist from Georgia
 John McAfee, anti-virus software businessman (originally declared as third-party candidate under named 'Cyber Party', before seeking Libertarian Party nomination)
 Ted Williams, voice actor from Ohio

Declined 
Individuals listed in this section were the focus of media speculation as being possible 2016 presidential candidates but unequivocally ruled out an independent presidential bid in 2016.

 Michael Bloomberg, Mayor of New York City 2002–2013
 David A. French, writer for National Review
 Jon Huntsman Jr., United States Ambassador to China 2009–2011; Governor of Utah 2005–2009; presidential candidate in 2012
 John Kasich, Governor of Ohio since 2011, presidential candidate in 2000, U.S. Representative from Ohio 1983–2001, Member of the Ohio Senate from the 15th district 1979-1983 (eventually received a faithless electoral vote in Texas)
 Dennis Michael Lynch, businessman, documentary film maker and conservative commentator from New York (formed an exploratory committee for a potential bid as an independent before electing to instead explore a potential bid for the Republican nomination)
 Bernie Sanders, U.S. Senator from Vermont since 2007; U.S. Representative from Vermont 1991–2007 (expressed interest in a possible independent presidential bid before declaring his candidacy for the Democratic Party nomination) He was registered as a write-in candidate in Vermont and California without his authorization.
 Jesse Ventura, Governor of Minnesota 1999–2003, Mayor of Brooklyn Park, Minnesota 1991–1995 (publicly expressed interest in a Libertarian Party candidacy instead, before declining to run altogether)
 Jim Webb, U.S. Senator from Virginia 2007–2013 (campaign)

See also 
 2016 Democratic Party presidential candidates
 2016 Republican Party presidential candidates
 2016 United States presidential election timeline

References

External links 
 2016 Presidential Form 2 Filers at the Federal Election Commission (FEC)

 
2016 presidential candidates